Kasulu Town is the second largest town in Kigoma Region, the first one being Kigoma-Ujiji municipality, also the thirteenth most populous town in Tanzania with a population of 208,244 as of 2012.

Location
Kasulu is located in northwestern Tanzania, near the international border with the Republic of Burundi. The town lies at the centre of Kasulu District, Kigoma Region. The coordinates of the town of Kasulu are:4° 34' 48.00"S, 30° 6' 0.00"E (Latitude:4.5800; Longitude:30.1000).

Population
, the population of the town was estimated at 19,324. as per 2012 national census, the population of Kasulu Town counted at 208,244, also in 2015 the population were counted at 224,880, while  National Bureau of Statistics (NBS) estimated at 229,218 and 234,783 in 2016 and 2017 respectively. Spoken languages are Kiswahili and Ha.

Economy
The town is the location of the headquarters of Kasulu District Administration. Agriculture is the main income-generating activity in the Council. Over 85% of inhabitants depend on crop and animal husbandry, while the remaining percentage depends on other economic activities such as Small and medium enterprise businesses (SMEs). The main food crops are maize, beans, cassava, sweet potatoes and banana. The main cash crops include coffee, tobacco and sugar cane. The per capita income of each individual in the council is estimated at Tshs. 685, 000/= per annum. Industrial contribution to the GDP of Kasulu Town is very minimal due to very little investment.

Government 
In 2011 Kasulu township became a town council. The highest decision body in Kasulu town is the Town Council under the leadership of the council chairman and town council director.

Administrative divisions 
Kasulu Town is administratively equal to a district and is divided into 2 divisions, 15 urban-level wards and 108 sub-ward (mitaa). Even though approximately every ward has its own centre, the real central business district (CBD) lies between Kumsenga and Murubona urban wards.

Wards 
The 15 Wards and their population in 2016.

 Heru Juu (16,982)
 Kigondo (18,150)
 Kimobwa (3,744)
 Kumnyika (12,429)
 Kumsenga (14,811)
 Msambara (24,646)
 Muganza (16,003)
 Muhunga (19,160)
 Murubona (23,522)
 Murufiti (10,451)
 Murusi (17,510)
 Mwilamvya (6,250)
 Nyansha (14,756)
 Nyumbigwa (12,811)
 Ruhita (17,991)

References

External links
 Location of Kasulu At Google Maps

Cities in the Great Rift Valley
Populated places in Kigoma Region